Events from the year 1820 in Ireland.

Events
30 January – Irish-born Royal Navy captain Edward Bransfield in the Williams is the first person positively to identify Antarctica as a land mass.
12 February – the East Indian and Fanny set sail from Cork with settlers for the Cape Colony.
6 May – failure of Newport's Bank in Waterford.
25 May – failure of Roche's Bank and stoppage of Leslie's Bank in Cork.
3 June – the Roman Catholic Cathedral of St Mary and St Anne in Cork is largely destroyed by arson.
8 July – act for lighting the city and suburbs of Dublin with gas.
20 July – Saint Cronan's Boys' National School opens in Bray, County Wicklow, as the Bray Male School.
December – Lough Allen Canal, giving through navigation between Carrick-on-Shannon and Lough Allen, opens.
The Royal Dublin Society adopts its "Royal" prefix when the new king George IV of the United Kingdom becomes its patron.
Suspension of construction of the Wellington Testimonial, Dublin, in Phoenix Park to the design of Robert Smirke.
First steamship on the Irish Sea crossing from Dublin to Liverpool, the Waterloo, introduced by George Langtry of Belfast.
Frederick Bourne begins to create the village of Ashbourne, County Meath.
Publication of James Hardiman's The History of the Town and County of the Town of Galway, from the earliest period to the present time in Dublin.
 Denny Meats are founded.

Arts and literature
Charles Maturin (anonymously) publishes Melmoth the Wanderer.
Regina Maria Roche publishes The Munster Cottage Boy: a Tale.

Births
19 February – John Tuigg, third Roman Catholic Bishop of Pittsburgh, Pennsylvania (died 1889 in the United States).
31 May – Timothy Burns, Lieutenant Governor of Wisconsin from 1851 to 1853 (died 1853).
3 June – Thomas William Moffett, scholar, educationalist and president of Queen's College Galway (died 1908).
4 June – John Kean, businessman and politician in Ontario (died 1892).
2 August – John Tyndall, physicist (died 1893).
6 October – James Travers, soldier, recipient of the Victoria Cross for gallantry in 1857 at Indore, India (died 1884).
22 November – Katherine Plunket, botanical artist and longest-lived Irish person ever (died 1932).
30 December – Mary Anne Sadlier, novelist (died 1903).
Full date unknown
Thomas Bellew, Galway landowner and politician (died 1863).
 John F. Kennedy's great-grandfather was born in the village of Dunganstown in County Wexford. 
Johnston Drummond, early settler of Western Australia, botanical and zoological collector (died 1845).
Ambrose Madden, recipient of the Victoria Cross for gallantry in 1854 in the Crimea, at Little Inkerman (died 1863).
Patrick Mylott, soldier, recipient of the Victoria Cross for gallantry in 1857 in India (died 1878).
Henry Hamilton O'Hara "Mad O'hara", "The Mad Squire of Craigbilly" (died 1875).
Kivas Tully, architect (died 1905).

Deaths
29 January – George III of the United Kingdom of Great Britain and Ireland (born 1738).
5 February – William Drennan, physician, poet, educationalist and co-founder of the Society of United Irishmen (born 1754).
13 February – Leonard McNally, informant against members of the Society of United Irishmen (born 1752).
20 March – Eaton Stannard Barrett, poet and author (born 1786).
6 June – Henry Grattan, member of Irish House of Commons and campaigner for legislative freedom for the Irish Parliament (born 1746).
Undated – Anthony Daly, a leader of the Whiteboy movement, hanged for attempted murder.

References

 
Years of the 19th century in Ireland
 
Ireland
 Ireland